Gusztáv Szepesi (17 July 1939 – 5 June 1987) was a Hungarian football defender who played for Hungary in the 1966 FIFA World Cup. He also played for FC Tatabánya.

References

External links
 FIFA profile

1939 births
1987 deaths
Hungarian footballers
Hungary international footballers
Olympic footballers of Hungary
Olympic gold medalists for Hungary
Olympic medalists in football
Footballers at the 1964 Summer Olympics
Medalists at the 1964 Summer Olympics
Association football defenders
FC Tatabánya players
1966 FIFA World Cup players
Sportspeople from Miskolc